Citizens charter in local governments in the Indian state of Kerala refers to a statement of paid and unpaid services, that a local government renders to a citizen residing in the local government area, for improving their living conditions and it includes the granting of financial assistance and the issue of permit, licence or certificate for any purpose. The charter enlists the name of services, the conditions for obtaining that service and the time limit within which the services are made available to the citizen.

Process of Preparation

Immediately after the constitution of the local government, following a general election, the local government shall, as soon as possible but not later than a period of six months therefrom, meet, discuss and decide as to whatever services the local government can make available to the Citizens, the conditions a Citizen shall have to fulfill for getting such a service and the time limit to make available the service.
Before taking a decision to publish the Citizens charter, the local government should seek the views of the Secretary of the local body, other Officers concerned and consider the factors like availability of Officials, sufficiency of fund, etc. to provide time bound services as offered in the citizens charter. The local governments should, simultaneously, determine, the procedure of providing service, the quality and the fee leviable for the service if it is a paid one.  It should be examined whether the service so offered to be rendered time bound shall be one that come within the ambit of the jurisdiction of the local government. The services offered by various institutions under the control of the local government should also be included in the citizens charter. The Charter should be prepared and published in the prescribed. The application form for obtaining the services should be made available to the people cost-free or by collecting the actual cost.

Publication of the Charter

The Citizens Charter prepared by the local governments in Kerala shall be published by
affixing it on the notice board at the Office of the local government and on other notice boards fixed at public places in the local government area. As well, the citizens charter shall be printed in booklet form and distributed free of cost among the public. The local government shall give necessary publicity to the Citizens Charter and shall take steps to make available copies of the Citizens Charter to those who demand. The gist of the Citizens Charter published by the Panchayat shall be written in paint on a board and exhibited in the local government office so as to enable the public to view it easily. The Citizens Charter, thus published, shall also be read out in the next meetings of the Grama Sabha for wider publicity.

Duration of the Charter

A Citizens Charter prepared and published by a local government shall remain in force till the expiry of the term of the said local government council and thereafter till a Citizens Charter is prepared and published by the newly constituted council of elected functionaries.

Procedure for Obtaining Services

A person, in need of service enlisted in the Charter, shall apply in the form prescribed, to the local government Secretary or to the Officer concerned. The local government should have an enquiry counter for distributing the application forms, for receiving application and for giving reply to the enquiries in the respective office.  A serial number shall be assigned to every application for service, received by the Secretary or the Officer concerned and the details such as the name of the applicant, the date of receipt of the application, the request in the application, etc. shall be recorded in a register. Immediately on receipt of an application, an acknowledgement receipt shall be issued to the applicant recording therein the probable date on which the service may be rendered, the name of the Officer whom the applicant may approach in this regard and other necessary details.

Obligation to Render Services

The local government, the secretary and the officers concerned in the local government have obligation to render a service referred in the Citizen's Charter to an eligible applicant within the respective time limit. The failure in providing the service will be treated as delinquency. If a service cannot be rendered within the stipulated time limit, the concerned Officer shall intimate the reason to the applicant within the said time limit. Simultaneously, if possible, the revised time limit shall also be intimated to the applicant. If an applicant feels that an Officer of the local body fails to render a service or cause delay, he may bring the complaint to the notice of the chairperson of the local government, which he shall personally examine and dispose of.

If a Chairperson or a Member of the local government or an Officer of the local government has deliberately committed default or delay in making available a service enlisted in the charter to a citizen, he may file a complaint before the Ombudsman for Local Governments in Kerala, alleging that the local government or the member of the local government or the Officer of the local government is guilty of committing ‘maladministration’ which is punishable by the Ombudsman.

Revision and Evaluation

The local government shall, once in every year, revise and update the Citizens Charter prepared and published after discussion. The purpose of revision of the Citizens Charter every year is for bringing in suitable changes based on the experience during the previous year and for including more services in it and for reducing the time limit in rendering the services. The revised citizens charter shall also be published in the notice boards of the local government and the copies shall be printed and distributed among the people. The local government shall often evaluate the progress in rendering services mentioned in the Citizens Charter and shall issue necessary guidelines to the Officers concerned.

A best practice

Cheruvannur-Nallalam Grama Panchayat has set a good example in implementing the Citizen’s
charter in the right spirit. The panchayat has put up a wall-sized Citizen's charter outside its office. The charter enlists 55 services, categorized under different heads, offered to its citizens numbering around 60,000 in total. The applications for the services are accepted in a counter. A receipt, denoting the possible date on which the service can be made available, will be issued on the spot.
The panchayat has as well, put up another large board at its entrance that provides the details of the section from where a particular service is offered and the officer in charge of the section and his presence so as to enable the citizens to obtain the services without hassles.

Simultaneously, the panchayat had experimented a front office counter where the applicant can submit the application and obtain the services, without going to the concerned section. Kerala Institute of Local Administration (KILA) has included the front office counter system as a best practice in its training programmes.

The panchayat has organized a well-kept record room which would help the panchayat  in providing information  under the right to information act. The report on good Governance at the grassroots level prepared by the  Centre for Good Governance cites Nallalam-Cheruvannur as a good example from Kerala.

The benefits or Outcome

The Charter makes it very clear that the services are their right and not a favour from the local government functionaries. The increasing demand for time bound services by the public may lead to qualitative improvement in services. The Charter will help the local body to evaluate the delivery of services annually and make necessary improvements in service delivery. The creation of The Charter will bring professionalism in to local government services and will help the services reach the less privileged class of people increasingly. The State of Kerala is showing a way to improve the service delivery in local government through creation of citizens charter.

See also
 Ombudsman for Local Governments in Kerala

Further reading

 Kerala Panchayat Raj Act 1994
 Kerala Municipality Act 1994
 Kerala Panchayat Raj (Preparation of Citizens Charter) Rules, 2004
 Kerala Municipality (Preparation of Citizens Charter) Rules, 2000

References

External links
	A brief Write-up in ‘Kerala Calling’
	
 Citizens Participation in Urban Local Bodies : Policy Imaplications for Central finance Commission
	

Local government in Kerala